Apan Amar Apan is a 1990 Bengali language drama film directed by Tarun Majumdar and produced by Pradip Kundalia. The film features actors Tapas Paul, Prosenjit Chatterjee and Satabdi Roy in the lead roles. Music of the film has been composed by R. D. Burman.

Cast 
 Tapas Paul
 Prosenjit Chatterjee
 Satabdi Roy
 Soumitra Chatterjee
 Subhendu Chatterjee
 Biplab Chatterjee
 Deepankar De
 Anup Kumar
 Indrani Dutta
 Shakuntala Barua
   Sanghamitra Banerjee

Soundtrack

Track listing

References

External links
 

Bengali-language Indian films
1990 films
Films scored by R. D. Burman
1990s Bengali-language films
Indian drama films